Andrea Mastino (born 2 September 1999) is an Italian footballer who plays for Serie D club Carbonia as a right back.

Club career
Born in Carbonia, Sardinia, and represented Cagliari as a youth. On 30 November 2016 he made his first team debut, starting in a 3–0 Coppa Italia away loss against Sampdoria, but being replaced at half-time.

On 30 July 2020 he joined Serie D club Prato.

References

External links

1999 births
Living people
People from the Province of South Sardinia
Footballers from Sardinia
Italian footballers
Association football fullbacks
Cagliari Calcio players
Olbia Calcio 1905 players
U.S. Gavorrano players
A.C. Prato players
Serie C players
Serie D players